Felipe Vinícius dos Santos (born 30 July 1994 in São Paulo) is a Brazilian athlete competing in the decathlon.

In 2015, he competed at the Pan America Games in Toronto, Ontario, Canada and he also competed at the Championships in Athletics in Beijing, China.

He qualified to represent Brazil at the 2020 Summer Olympics.

Competition record

Personal bests
Outdoor
100 metres – 10.37 (+1.4 m/s) (Toronto 2015)
400 metres – 47.73 (São Paulo 2014)
1000 metres – 2:44.38 (Lille 2011)
1500 metres – 4:39.82 (São Paulo 2013)
110 metres hurdles – 13.74 (+0.5 m/s) (São Paulo 2015)
High jump – 2.07 (São Paulo 2020)
Pole vault – 4.95 (Bragança Paulista 2021)
Long jump – 7.64 (-1.4 m/s) (São Paulo 2020)
Shot put – 14.22 (Toronto 2015)
Discus throw – 43.67 (São Paulo 2021)
Javelin throw – 61.33 (Bragança Paulista 2022)
Decathlon – 8364 (São Paulo 2020)
Indoor
60 metres – 6.85 (Prague 2014)
1000 metres – 2:50.02 (Tallinn 2014)
60 metres hurdles – 8.00 (Tallinn 2014)
High jump – 2.01 (Tallinn 2014)
Pole vault – 5.10 (Bragança Paulista 2020)
Long jump – 7.44 (Tallinn 2014)
Shot put – 14.08 (Bratislava 2014)
Heptathlon – 5765 (Tallinn 2014)

See also
 Brazil at the 2015 World Championships in Athletics

References

Living people
1994 births
Athletes from São Paulo
Brazilian decathletes
Brazilian male athletes
Pan American Games athletes for Brazil
Athletes (track and field) at the 2015 Pan American Games
World Athletics Championships athletes for Brazil
Athletes (track and field) at the 2018 South American Games
South American Games bronze medalists for Brazil
South American Games medalists in athletics
Ibero-American Championships in Athletics winners
Troféu Brasil de Atletismo winners
Athletes (track and field) at the 2020 Summer Olympics
Olympic athletes of Brazil